A bile duct hamartoma or biliary hamartoma, is a benign tumour-like malformation
of the liver.

They are classically associated with polycystic liver disease, as may be seen in the context of polycystic kidney disease, and represent a malformation of the liver plate.

Cause
Bile duct hamartomas are a developmental anomaly in which abnormal tissues are present at normal site due to failure of regression of embryonic biliary duct.

Diagnosis

At CT scans, bile duct hamartomas appear as small, well-defined hypo- or isoattenuating masses with little or no enhancement after contrast administration.  At MRI, they appear hypointense on T1-weighted images, iso- or slightly hyperintense on T2-weighted images, and hypointense after administration of gadolinium based contrast-agent. On imaging, multiple hamartomas may look similar to metastases or microabscesses.

Treatment
Observation as there is increased risk of cholangiocarcinoma.

Eponym
The eponymous terms (von Meyenburg complex, Meyenburg complex) are named for Hanns von Meyenburg.

Additional images

See also
 Cholestasis
 Ground glass hepatocyte
 Mallory body

References

Congenital disorders of digestive system